Zeevang is a former municipality in northwestern Netherlands, in the province of North Holland. Since 2016, Zeevang has been part of the municipality of Edam-Volendam.

Population centres 
The former municipality of Zeevang consisted of the following cities, towns, villages and/or districts: Beets, Etersheim, Hobrede, Kwadijk, Middelie, Oosthuizen, Schardam, Warder.

Local government 
The municipal council of Zeevang consisted of 13 seats, which were divided as follows (2015):

 Zeevangs Belang - 7 seats
 VVD - 3 seats
 PvdA - 2 seats
 CDA - 1 seat

References

External links

Official website

Edam-Volendam
Former municipalities of North Holland
Municipalities of the Netherlands disestablished in 2016